The Las Vegas Beltway (officially named the Bruce Woodbury Beltway) is a  beltway route circling three-quarters of the Las Vegas Valley in southern Nevada. The Las Vegas Beltway carries two numerical designations. Approximately  of the highway, from its southern terminus at Interstate 11 (I-11) / I-515 / U.S. Route 93 (US 93) / US 95 in Henderson west and northwest to I-15, is signed as Interstate 215 (I-215) and maintained by the Nevada Department of Transportation. Clark County Route 215 (CC 215) composes the remaining  of this semi-circumferential highway, with the county's Department of Public Works responsible for all construction and maintenance.

The Las Vegas Beltway currently consists of two different road types: freeway and an interim expressway. The beltway is currently a freeway from the I-11/I-515 interchange in Henderson to just west of US 95 in northwest Las Vegas. The remainder of the beltway is a mix of freeway and expressway, with several of the expressway sections being upgraded to Interstate freeway standards.

The beltway was planned and constructed by Clark County. This marked the first time in the United States that a county had overseen the construction of an Interstate highway with little to no state or federal funding. Once completely upgraded to a freeway, the CC 215 portion of the beltway will be redesignated I-215 and the entire facility turned over to the Nevada Department of Transportation for maintenance.

Route description

The Las Vegas Beltway begins in Henderson at the I-11 / I-515 / US 93 / US 95 interchange, where traffic on westbound Nevada State Route 564 (SR 564, Lake Mead Parkway) defaults onto I-215 west. From here, the beltway primarily follows the former Lake Mead Drive alignment west to the Pecos Road / Saint Rose Parkway (SR 146) interchange. The highway then curves northwest toward Harry Reid International Airport before turning west to cross under Las Vegas Boulevard and I-15.

As the beltway passes under I-15, it changes from Interstate to county highway still maintaining freeway status as it heads nearly due west. Passing Decatur Boulevard, two one-way frontage roads (which formerly carried the initial beltway facilities) appear on either side of the highway. At Durango Drive, the roadway curves northward. The frontage roads end as the highway reaches Tropicana Avenue, but the freeway continues briefly west and then north again to intersect Charleston Boulevard (SR 159) near Red Rock Canyon. As it passes north through the community of Summerlin (part of the city of Las Vegas), the beltway meets Summerlin Parkway at a partial system interchange.

From here, the freeway continues north along the western foothills of Las Vegas to pass behind Lone Mountain. Soon afterward, the beltway curves to the east and downgrades from freeway to an expressway (with two at-grade intersections at US 95 south, Oso Blanca Road and Sky Pointe Drive) after it passes the Durango Drive interchange and intersects US 95 at an interchange currently under construction. From there, the beltway continues as a freeway nearly due east along the alignment of Centennial Parkway before entering northern North Las Vegas at Decatur Boulevard. From there, it swings northeast, passing by the large Aliante development before turning east again. Much of the final few miles of the route, from here on, are in undeveloped land, except near the interchange at North 5th Street. The beltway has additional interchanges at Losee Road, North Pecos Road, and North Lamb Boulevard before it swings southeast and reaches its clockwise terminus at I-15, US 93, and Tropical Parkway at an at-grade diamond interchange just west of the Las Vegas Motor Speedway.

History

Much of the beltway was built completely with local funds and expressway to freeway upgrades have continued to be built without state or federal money (except for the I-515 interchange upgrade). A tax measure voted on by the County residents increased funding for the beltway. As a result, it was expected to be fully upgraded to a freeway by 2013, rather than the previous goal of 2025. However, at present, it appears that this target date has slipped back at least a few years.

The first section of I-215 opened to traffic in 1996 from I-15 to Warm Springs Road, including the Harry Reid Airport Connector and tunnel, which linked Harry Reid International Airport to southern metro Las Vegas without requiring motorists to use Tropicana Avenue or Russell Road to access the main passenger terminal. The southeast leg of the beltway (except for the I-515 connection) was completed ahead of schedule in 1999, while the northern end was extended from Decatur Boulevard in 1998 to Tropicana Avenue by 2000. The remaining sections in the western and northern legs of the beltway were completed by 2003—either in their final, full freeway mode, or in one of two lesser interim configurations.

I-215 was built on the SR 146 alignment between a point just east of exit 6 (Saint Rose Parkway / Pecos Road) and mile 0 (the I-515 / US 93 / US 95 interchange at Lake Mead Parkway, formerly known as Lake Mead Drive). Since the Nevada Department of Transportation (NDOT) does not cosign state routes along Interstate highways, SR 146 was truncated to its current eastern terminus at I-215. SR 146 was cosigned with I-215 from Pecos Road to I-515 / US 93 / US 95, even though the state highway designation no longer existed in this section when the freeway was completed. SR 146 signs on I-215 have since been removed.

Roads & Bridges magazine, a national publication that provides technology news and information to the transportation construction industry, named the Las Vegas Beltway as one of the nation's Top Ten Road Projects in 2002.

At the Board of County Commission meeting on March 2, 2004, the beltway was renamed as the Bruce Woodbury Beltway. The Board approved a resolution recognizing Republican Clark County Commissioner Bruce L. Woodbury for his many years and efforts in the future of transportation in the valley. On August 9, 2006, a section of freeway was completed that allowed the connection of two previously built freeway portions. This meant a continuous stretch of road consisting of about half the road's overall mileage, from the I-515 / SR 564 terminus to Charleston Boulevard, was now completed to freeway standards.

Recent and future improvements
Construction of the North 5th Street interchange was completed and fully opened to traffic in September 2011. The project's scope included roadway, bridge, drainage, and utility improvements along the northern beltway at the intersection of North 5th Street in North Las Vegas. Begun in 2012 and completed in 2014, construction by the Clark County Department of Public Works built the northern beltway segment between Tenaya Way and Decatur Boulevard. The project widened CC 215 to four lanes, built two new interchanges at Jones and Decatur Boulevards and a new bridge to carry Bradley Road over the freeway. Improvements to the beltway were also completed in the southern region of the valley with upgrades between I-15 and Windmill Lane. This project provided one additional travel lane in each direction, auxiliary lanes between interchanges and included the widening of four bridges over I-215 at Paradise, Warm Springs, and Robindale roads as well as for the Harry Reid Airport Connector. Additionally, the beltway from Decatur Blvd to North 5th Street was built out from 2014 to fall 2016. A new bridge was built for the expected extension of Revere Street and the roadway widened to a four-lane freeway from Decatur Boulevard to North 5th Street.

Construction projects on the 215 Beltway included a conversion of the roadways between Craig and Hualapai to a four-lane freeway with interchanges at Lone Mountain Road and Ann Road and a grade separation for Centennial Parkway and the further improvements to the McCarran Airport Connector with the McCarran Airport Connector 2 project. Additionally, phased construction of the Centennial Bowl system interchange between the Beltway and the US 95 freeway in the northwest valley continues. The northbound US 95 to eastbound I-215 ramp was completed on May 28, 2016. The westbound I-215 to southbound US 95 flyover ramp opened on July 12, 2017. Additionally, an expanded bridge over Montecito Parkway was also completed in anticipation of the widening of the Beltway between Durango Drive and Tenaya Way as part of the construction of the Centennial Bowl interchange.

Construction on the Losee Road, North Pecos Road, and North Lamb Boulevard interchanges in North Las Vegas began in August 2019. The Losee Road and North Pecos interchanges were both completed and fully opened to traffic on March 3, 2020, while the North Lamb Boulevard interchange was completed and fully opened to traffic in April 2020. The interchanges were all previously temporary at-grade split intersections with traffic signals which opened in 2006. Currently, a Range Road interchange is being built, along with an upgraded interchange between CC 215 and I-15 at the north terminus. It is to be completed by the end of 2022.

Exit list

Notes

References

External links 

 Bruce Woodbury Beltway page at Clark County website
 AARoads: Las Vegas Beltway

Interstate 15
Beltways in the United States
Transportation in Clark County, Nevada
Transportation in the Las Vegas Valley
215